The Endreson Cabin is a log cabin built about 1858 which has been preserved as a museum near Willmar, Minnesota, United States. It was listed on the National Register of Historic Places in 1986 as the Lars and Guri Endreson House, after the Norwegian-American immigrants who built it. It is one of the oldest buildings on its original site in Kandiyohi County and a rare vestige of its Euro-American settlement prior to the Dakota War of 1862, in which numerous pioneers were killed (including two Endresons) and most of the rest abandoned the area for several years.

References

External links
 Guri Endreson Cabin - Kandiyohi County Historical Society

Buildings and structures in Kandiyohi County, Minnesota
Houses completed in 1858
Houses on the National Register of Historic Places in Minnesota
Log buildings and structures on the National Register of Historic Places in Minnesota
National Register of Historic Places in Kandiyohi County, Minnesota